Rathcormack or Rathcormac is a village in County Sligo, Ireland. It is 6 km north of Sligo town on the N15 road between Benbulbin mountain and the sea.

Sean nós dance festival
There is an annual Sean nós dancing festival held in May, organised by the local Cos Cos Dance Company.

References

See also
 List of towns and villages in Ireland

Towns and villages in County Sligo